Žaneta Tóthová (born 6 August 1984) is a Slovak handball player for Stella St-Maur Handball and the Slovak national team.

References

1984 births
Living people
Slovak female handball players
Slovak expatriate sportspeople in France